Bazje   is a village in Croatia. It is connected by the D5 highway.

References

Populated places in Virovitica-Podravina County